Two Hannover Square is a 29-story  skyscraper at 434 Fayetteville Street in Raleigh, North Carolina with  of office space. Its major tenant is Truist bank. From its opening in 1991 until the completion of RBC Plaza in 2008, it was Raleigh's tallest building.

History
Two Hannover Square, built by the same company as nearby One Hannover Square, opened in 1991 as one of the two tallest buildings in Raleigh, the other being First Union Capitol Center. Because both buildings added so much office space to downtown Raleigh at about the same time, the owners had a hard time finding tenants, and in the case of Two Hannover Plaza, the result was bankruptcy.

Phoenix Limited Partnership bought Two Hannover Plaza in 1993 for $18.5 million.

In late 2021, the building's iconic BB&T logo was replaced with that Truist Financial, the company that formed from the merger of BB&T and SunTrust Bank.

Gallery

See also 
 List of tallest buildings in Raleigh, North Carolina
 List of tallest buildings in North Carolina

References

Skyscraper office buildings in Raleigh, North Carolina
Office buildings completed in 1991